The third edition of the women's Strade Bianche was held on 4 March 2017, in Tuscany, Italy. Elisa Longo Borghini won the race, in bad weather, ahead of Katarzyna Niewiadoma and the previous year's champion, Lizzie Deignan.

The women's Strade Bianche served as the first event of the second UCI Women's World Tour, the highest level of professional women's cycling.  The race is organized on the same day as the men's event, at a shorter distance, but on much of the same roads.

Results

See also
 2017 in women's road cycling
 2017 UCI Women's World Tour

References

Strade Bianche
Strade Bianche
Strade Bianche